William Morrison Ruthrauff (February 24, 1884 – August 5, 1969) was an American football player and coach.  He served as the fifth head football coach at the University of Arizona, coaching for one season in 1905 and compiling a record of 5–2.

Head coaching record

References

External links
 

1884 births
1969 deaths
19th-century players of American football
Arizona Wildcats football coaches
Carthage Firebirds football players
People from Constantine, Michigan